In baseball statistics, a double play (denoted as DP) is the act of making two outs during the same continuous play. One double play is recorded for every defensive player who participates in the play, regardless of how many of the outs in which they were directly involved, and is counted in addition to whatever putouts and assists might also apply. Double plays can occur any time there is at least one baserunner and fewer than two outs. Shortstop, abbreviated SS, is a baseball or softball fielding position in the infield, commonly stationed between second and third base, which is considered to be among the most demanding defensive positions. The position is mostly filled by defensive specialists, so shortstops are generally relatively poor batters who typically hit lower in the batting order. In the numbering system used to record defensive plays, the shortstop is assigned the number 6.

Shortstops typically record a double play by fielding a ground ball and then either throwing to the second baseman to force out the runner advancing to second base, or stepping on the base themselves before throwing to first base to retire the batter/runner, or by receiving a throw from another player to force a runner at second base before the throw to first base is made. Shortstops generally benefit in this respect from playing alongside an excellent second baseman with great range and quickness; strong middle infields are regarded as crucial to a team's defensive play, and double play totals are regarded as a strong indicator of their defensive skill. Double plays are also recorded when the shortstop catches a line drive, then throws to a base before the runner can tag up, or another infielder or the pitcher catches the line drive and then throws to the shortstop in the same situation; on occasion, the throw might come from an outfielder after an unexpected catch of a fly ball. Other double plays occur when the shortstop records an out at second base, then throws out a runner attempting to advance on the basepaths, or on a double steal attempt in which the catcher throws out a runner attempting to steal second base, and the shortstop throws back to the catcher to retire a runner trying to steal home. Double plays are also occasionally recorded when a rundown play is involved, almost always as the second out. Because of the high number of ground outs, shortstops and second basemen typically record far more double plays than players at any other position except first base.

Most of the career leaders are relatively recent players who have benefitted from improved infield defense, with equipment of better quality; nine of the top twelve players made their major league debut after 1969, and only one was active before 1951. Five of the top nine players spent their entire careers with one team. Longer careers have compensated for the fact that as strikeout totals have risen in baseball, the frequency of other defensive outs including ground outs has declined, with double play totals for shortstops likewise declining; 18 of the top 25 single-season totals were recorded between 1944 and 1988, and none of the top 478 were recorded before 1920. Omar Vizquel holds the record for the most career double plays by a shortstop with 1,734. Only three other shortstops have recorded 1,500 career double plays.

Key

List

Stats updated through the 2022 season

Other Hall of Famers

Notes

References

External links

Major League Baseball statistics
Double plays as a shortstop